Gian Mario Spacca (born 16 February 1953) is an Italian politician who was the President of the Marche Region from 2005 to 2015.

Biography

Gian Mario Spacca was born in Fabriano on 16 February 1953. In 1976 he graduated from La Sapienza University of Rome with a degree in Political Science. His thesis director in Criminal Law and Procedure was Aldo Moro.

In 1979 he joined the Research Department of the Merloni Finanziaria S.p.A. as a manager. He served on the board of directors of the Aristide Merloni Foundation and was coordinator of cultural activities and research from 1982 to 1990. Since 1982 he has been editor of the magazine Economia Marche, published by Il Mulino. From 1993 to 2000 he was Vice President of the Foundation Gioventù Chiesa e Speranza that collaborates in the organization and execution of World Youth Day.

In 1990 he was elected member of the Regional Council of Marche and became Chairman of the Committee on Planning and The Environment. In 1993 he was named Councillor for Crafts, Industry, Professional Training and Labour. In 1995 he was re-elected and nominated Councillor for Productive Activities. After being re-elected in 2000, he was nominated Vice-Chair of the Regional Government. He was affiliated with the centrist Margherita party. On 4 April 2005 he was elected President of Marche for the centre-left The Union coalition (of which Margherita was a member), with 57.75% of the vote or 499,793 votes. He also represented Marche on the European Union's Committee of Regions. On 29 March 2010 he was re-elected as President of the region with 53.17% of the vote.

He was affiliated to the Democratic Party (PD) into which the major components of The Union coalition merged in 2007, and formally became a member of the party in 2012. In the run-up to the 2015 regional election, he left the DP and ran independently, as head of the centrist "project" Marche 2020 which ran joint lists with the centre-right Popular Area alliance. His candidacy for reelection was also supported by centre-right Forza Italia, but not his former party PD. He was defeated by the official PD candidate Luca Ceriscioli by a wide margin and was placed fourth, even behind the candidates of Five Star Movement and Lega Nord Marche. His presidential ballot won only 14.2% of the votes, and only 4.0% voted for his Marche 2020 list (most votes for his presidential bid coming from Forza Italia voters).

References

External links
 Official website 

1953 births
Living people
Presidents of Marche
Democratic Party (Italy) politicians
21st-century Italian politicians
Sapienza University of Rome alumni
People from the Province of Ancona